Mohammad Ebrahim Zainuddin "Ebbu" Ghazali (15 June 1924 – 26 April 2003) was a Pakistan Air Force officer, cricketer and cricket administrator who played for Pakistan in two Tests in 1954.

Early life and family
Ghazali was born in Bombay, British India, on 15 June 1924, in a Urdu-speaking Konkani Muslim family. His family migrated to Karachi after the Creation of Pakistan in 1947.

Ghazali was the son-in-law of Feroze Khan who won a gold medal in the 1928 Olympics for India in field hockey and whose son Farooq Feroze Khan served as Chairman Joint Chiefs of Staff Committee in the Pakistan Air Force. He was also a relative of Ijaz Faqih: his sister was Ijaz Faqih's mother-in-law.

Career
Ghazali played first-class cricket in India and Pakistan from 1943 to 1956. A middle-order batsman and off-spin bowler, he made his top score in the inaugural season of the Quaid-e-Azam Trophy when he scored 160 and 61 for Combined Services against Karachi in December 1953. He took his best bowling figures of 5 for 28 in April 1955 when he captained Combined Services against Punjab in the semi-final of the Quaid-e-Azam Trophy.

He toured England with the Pakistan team in 1954, but was only moderately successful, making 601 runs at an average of 28.61 and taking 17 wickets at 39.64. In his second Test, at Old Trafford, he was dismissed for a pair within two hours, the fastest in Test history.

After his playing career, Ghazali became an administrator. He managed Pakistan's tour of Australia and New Zealand in 1972–73. He served in the Pakistan Air Force, reaching the rank of wing commander.

References

External links
 Ebrahim Ghazali at Cricket Archive
 Ebbu Ghazali at Cricinfo

1924 births
2003 deaths
Pakistan Test cricketers
Maharashtra cricketers
Pakistani cricketers
Sindh cricketers
Muslims cricketers
South Zone cricketers
Combined Services (Pakistan) cricketers
Pakistan Air Force officers
Indian emigrants to Pakistan
Indian cricketers
Pakistani cricket administrators
Cricketers from Mumbai
Pakistani people of Konkani descent